Happy Trails is a video game programmed by Carol Shaw for the Intellivision console and released by Activision in 1983. The player must navigate a character through a broken maze to collect gold. Shaw previously wrote River Raid for the Atari 2600.

Happy Trails is a clone of the 1982 Konami arcade game Loco-Motion. Mattel was working on an official port, but Happy Trails was published first, resulting in Loco-Motion being sold at a discount and without any marketing support.

Reception
Joystik magazine wrote, "This is a great game. The strategic possibilities are seemingly endless," giving an overal rating of 5 out of 5 stars.

References

Intellivision games
Intellivision-only games
1983 video games
Activision games
Video game clones
Video games developed in the United States